Samsaengi is a 2013 South Korean television series starring Hong Ah-reum, Son Sung-yoon, Cha Do-jin, and Ji Il-joo. It aired on KBS2 from January 7 to June 21, 2013 on Mondays to Fridays at 9:00 a.m. for 120 episodes.

Plot
Samsaengi is set in the 70's in Seoul and tells the story of a woman (played by Hong Ah-reum) who becomes a promising oriental herbal doctor after going through many ups and downs in her life. It is also about innocent, yet desperate love of four different people who have different ways of love.

Cast

Main characters
Hong Ah-reum - Seok Sam-saeng
Kwak Ji-hye - young Seok Sam-saeng
Jung Ji-so - teen Seok Sam-saeng 
Son Seong-yoon - Bong Geum-ok
Jang Seo-hee - young Bong Geum-ok
Kim Ji-min - teen Bong Geum-ok 
Cha Do-jin - Park Dong-woo
Kim Ji-hoon - teen Park Dong-woo
Ji Il-joo - Oh Ji-sung
Jung Yoo-geun - young Oh Ji-sung 
Kim Seung-chan - teen Oh Ji-sung

Supporting characters
Seok Bong-chool's family
Lee Dol-hyung - Seok Bong-chool
Lee Ah-hyun - Ko Mak-rye
Shin Hyun-tak - Seok Chang-sik
Jung Seung-won - teen Seok Chang-sik 
Lee Soo-bin - Seok Chang-hee

Bong Moo-ryong's family
Dokgo Young-jae - Bong Moo-ryong
Yoo Tae-woong - Sa Ki-jin
Lee Yeon-soo - Hae-joo
Ban Hyo-jung - Bong Moo-ryong's mother

Oh Pil-soon's family
Kim Na-woon - Oh Pil-soon
Ko Do-young - Jung Yoon-hee
Lee Jae-in - young Jung Yoon-hee
Kim Hye-yoon - teen Jung Yoon-hee

Oh In-soo's family
Kim Seung-wook - Oh In-soo
Kim Do-yeon - Park Kyung-ja

Extended cast
Ha Soo-ho - Young-bae

Awards and nominations

See also
Korean Broadcasting System

References

External links
Samsaengi official KBS website 

Korean Broadcasting System television dramas
2013 South Korean television series debuts
2013 South Korean television series endings
Korean-language television shows
Television series set in the 1970s
South Korean romance television series